KQTV (channel 2) is a television station in St. Joseph, Missouri, United States, affiliated with ABC and owned by Heartland Media. The station's studios and transmitter are located on Faraon Street in eastern St. Joseph.

Although KQTV serves as the primary ABC affiliate for the St. Joseph market, the network's Kansas City affiliate KMBC-TV (channel 9) is considered an alternate ABC affiliate for the area as its transmitter provides a city-grade over-the-air signal in St. Joseph proper, and is carried alongside KQTV, by some local cable providers.

History

Early history
The station first signed on the air on September 27, 1953, as KFEQ-TV. It was founded by local businessman Barton Pitts, owner of local radio station KFEQ (680 AM). KFEQ-TV originally operated as a primary CBS affiliate, and also carried programming from the DuMont Television Network. The tower, which had become landmark in the city of St. Joseph, is often compared to the  tower used by KCTV (channel 5) in Kansas City. The two stations, which signed on the air on the same date, built their respective towers at the same time.

In 1955, KFEQ-AM-TV were sold by Pitts to the Midland Broadcasting Company. Midland Broadcasting was headed by singer-actor Bing Crosby and previously owned KMBC-TV in Kansas City. Shortly after DuMont shut down in on August 6, 1956, KFEQ-TV began carrying ABC programming as a secondary affiliation. During the late 1950s, the station was also briefly affiliated with the NTA Film Network. The News-Press & Gazette Company (owned by the Bradley family, and which would sign on Fox affiliate KNPN-LD (channel 26) in 2012) bought the KFEQ stations in 1957. The stations were later sold to the Panax Corporation in 1963.

On June 1, 1967, KFEQ-TV became an exclusive ABC affiliate. ABC's Kansas City affiliate, KCMO-TV (now KCTV), which had been affiliated with the network since September 1955, switched to CBS. It became the St. Joseph market's default CBS station as a result.

Ownership changes
The station's call letters were changed to KQTV in 1969, after the television and radio stations were sold off to separate owners. KQTV went for $3.1 million to Kansas City based ISC Industries. ISC Industries was a diversified company with many different holdings. In 1973, ISC sold KQTV and radio stations KGRV and KLYX for $4.6 million to Amaturo Group. In 1979, Amaturo sold KQTV to Elba Development of Rochester, New York for $9 million. In 1990, Elba sold KQTV, along with WRBL in Columbus, Georgia and WTWO in Terre Haute, Indiana, to TCS Television Partners for $58 million. Nexstar Broadcasting Group acquired the station in 1997.

Sale to Heartland Media
Nexstar announced on June 13, 2016, that it would sell KQTV and four other stations to Heartland Media, through its USA Television MidAmerica Holdings joint venture with MSouth Equity Partners, for $115 million. The sale was required as part of Nexstar's planned merger with Media General to comply with Federal Communications Commission (FCC) ownership caps. The sale was completed on January 17, 2017.

Aborted sale to News-Press & Gazette Company
On April 4, 2019, the St. Joseph-based News-Press & Gazette Company announced it would acquire KQTV from Heartland Media for an initially undisclosed price. Pending FCC approval, the purchase of KQTV would result in News-Press & Gazette maintaining a broadcasting and print monopoly in St. Joseph, as the company already owns the St. Joseph News-Press, three major-network-affiliated competitors of KQTV (Fox affiliate KNPN-LD (channel 26), NBC affiliate KNPG-LD (channel 21) and CBS affiliate KCJO-LD (channel 30), plus a 24-hour local news channel News-Press NOW).

While it would constitute a de facto quadropoly, the purchase may not violate FCC broadcast ownership rules as KQTV is a full-power station while KNPN, KNPG and KCJO are all low-power stations. (FCC local ownership rules restrict a single broadcasting company from owning more than two of the four highest-rated television stations in the same market, but applies the rule exclusively to full-power stations due to their broader signal reach.) However, the likelihood of concentrating St. Joseph's print and broadcast media outlets under one entity, given the DMA's small size, could subject the acquisition to potential antitrust issues once the deal undergoes review by the Justice Department. The FCC did not act on the sale application before the agreement's expiration on September 30, 2019, leading NPG to terminate its bid that October; the sale was dismissed on October 16, 2019. KQTV was not included in the subsequent sale of most of Heartland Media's other stations to Allen Media.

Market status
St. Joseph ranks 201st out of 210 media markets designated by Nielsen Media Research; it serves several rural portions of northeastern Kansas and northwestern Missouri. However, during the analog era, KQTV provided at least grade B signal coverage to much of Kansas City and Topeka; the channel 2 signal traveled a long distance under normal atmospheric conditions. Its digital signal still has considerable penetration in both cities despite operating on a short transmitter tower. In turn, stations from Kansas City, Topeka and Omaha are receivable over-the-air in portions of the St. Joseph market and are also available on some cable and satellite providers: Suddenlink, DirecTV and Dish Network carry Kansas City's KSMO-TV as the area's default MyNetworkTV affiliate and KCPT as the area's default PBS member station. Kansas City's WDAF-TV (channel 4), which was displaced as the default Fox affiliate by KNPN-LD on Suddenlink and Dish Network when that station signed on, continued to be available on DirecTV until June 30, 2012, when it was replaced by KNPN. As a result of the heavy signal overlap between the Kansas City and St. Joseph area stations, St. Joseph could be considered a sub-market of the adjacent Kansas City market.

TBN owned-and-operated station KTAJ-TV (channel 16), which mainly serves Kansas City, became the second television station licensed to St. Joseph when it signed-on in October 1986. However, KQTV remained the market's only local commercial station until June 2, 2012, when the News-Press & Gazette Company (owned by KQTV's one-time owners, the Bradley family) signed on KNPN-LD as the area's Fox affiliate. News-Press & Gazette (which also owns local news and weather channel News-Press NOW) later signed on KBJO-LD (now KNPG-LD) as the area's CW+ (now NBC) affiliate in March 2013 and KNPG-LD (now KCJO-LD) as a Telemundo (now CBS) affiliate in 2014.

Programming
Syndicated programs broadcast by KQTV include Live with Kelly and Ryan, Dr. Phil, Jeopardy! and Wheel of Fortune. In addition, the station produces St. Joe Channel Showcase, a half-hour business showcase program that airs on Monday and Wednesday mornings. KQTV runs the entire ABC network schedule. Previously, the station did not carry ABC's overnight news program World News Now; this was because it was one of the few remaining American television stations that signed off during overnight hours, from 1:35 to 5:00 a.m.

KFEQ-TV's early personalities included Grace Crawford and her pre-1963 predecessor Marge Miner, who had hosted daytime talk shows during the 1950s and 1960s that were aimed at a female audience, among which included Panorama. Marge Miner was a 1959 recipient of the McCall's magazine Golden Mike Award, a national award given to outstanding women in broadcasting, for her series of programs on cerebral palsy.

The station also broadcast live professional wrestling matches that were held in the KFEQ/KQTV studios for many years, which aired after the late newscast on Saturday nights. Originally named Wrestling with Bob, named for the host Bob Whyte. The program was later named Big 2 Wrestling, featured a recording of "The Wrestling Polka" at the start of every broadcast; local business owners would come to ringside and talk about their services between matches. Sometimes, the live commercial chats occurred between falls of matches, while losing wrestlers recovered in the background.

The station featured a live Saturday afternoon record-hop program, which debuted on April 14, 1957, Let's Dance which featured local high school or college students dancing in the TV studio with music provided the week's current Top 10 records and live performances from local bands. The popular show ran until 1971. The show hosts were local TV and radio personalities, Allen Shaw, Bill Foster, Danny Taylor and Jim Connors.

During its early years as an exclusive affiliate of ABC, the station occasionally pre-empted network programs; most notably, KQTV originally declined The Brady Bunch, airing a local country music program in its Friday night timeslot, before adding the sitcom halfway through its first season (KMBC in the nearby Kansas City market similarly preempted the first season of The Brady Bunch in its entirety); the program was carried instead on Kansas City-based independent station KCIT-TV  (channel 50, now KPXE-TV).

News operation
KQTV presently broadcasts 18½ hours of locally produced newscasts each week (with 3½ hours each weekday and a half-hour each on Saturdays and Sundays); unlike most ABC affiliates in the Central Time Zone, it does not carry a midday newscast on weekdays or an early evening newscast on weekends. The station has a high turnover rate among its on-air anchoring and reporting staff, with most eventually moving on to larger markets. Gordie Hershiser, brother of former Cy Young Award winner Orel Hershiser, once served as a sports anchor at the station, succeeding longtime sports director John Baccala.

On August 24, 2007, KQTV marked long-time meteorologist Mike Bracciano's 20th anniversary with the station. Current and former station personnel paid tribute to Bracciano during an hour-long broadcast originating from East Hills Mall. Among those appearing in person or via taped message included Baccala, and former news anchors John Bassford and Nancy Lewis (the latter who, along with Bracciano, served as the original hosts of the station's Live at Five newscast, when it premiered in the early 1990s).

Notable Former Staff 
 Miles O'Brien (journalist), later with CNN and PBS

Technical information

Subchannels
The station's digital signal is multiplexed:

On March 1, 2018, subchannel 2.2 went live and began carrying Antenna TV.

Analog-to-digital conversion
KQTV began broadcasting its digital signal at 1,000 kW on UHF channel 53 in 2003. Since that allocation was among the high band UHF channels (52-69) that were removed from broadcasting use as a result of the transition, it seemed likely that KQTV would relocate its digital signal to VHF channel 2. However, low-band VHF signals are more prone to interference from atmospheric conditions than higher channel numbers. For these reasons when the station discontinued regular programming on its analog signal, over VHF channel 2, on February 18, 2009, the station's digital signal moved to VHF channel 7. Through the use of PSIP, digital television receivers display the station's virtual channel as its former VHF analog channel 2.

References

 TV Guide (1970–1972)

External links
 

Television channels and stations established in 1953
1953 establishments in Missouri
QTV
ABC network affiliates
Antenna TV affiliates